The 2021 Cypriot Super Cup was the 51st edition of Cypriot Super Cup, an annual football match played between 2020-21 Cypriot champions, Omonia, and 2020-21 cup winners, Anorthosis Famagusta FC. The game was held at the GSP Stadium in Nicosia. Omonia won 3-2 on penalties, after a 1–1 draw. The game was broadcast by Alpha TV Cyprus.

Match

Details

References

Sources

External links 

Highlights of the match

2021
2021 in association football